Richard Brinkley (died c.1379) was an English Franciscan scholastic philosopher and theologian. He was at the University of Oxford in the mid-fourteenth century; he produced a Summa Logicae in a nominalist vein in the 1360s or early 1370s, and other works.

References
 Michael J. Fitzgerald,  Richard Brinkley's Theory of Sentential Reference: "De Significato Propositionis" from Part V of His "Summa Nova de Logica", Leiden: Brill, 1987.
Paul Vincent Spade and Gordon Anthony Wilson (editors) (1995), Richard Brinkley's Obligationes: A Late Fourteenth Century Treatise on the Logic of Disputation, Münster: Aschendorff, 1995.

Notes

External links
 Richardus Brinkley (Richard Brinkel, fourteenth century, d. ca. 1379) [Last modified: 14 February 2010]

Scholastic philosophers
English Franciscans
English philosophers
Medieval English theologians
14th-century English people